KQST (102.9 FM, "Q102.9") is a radio station broadcasting a Top 40 format. Licensed to Sedona, Arizona, United States, the station serves the Flagstaff, Arizona, area. The station is currently owned by Yavapai Broadcasting Corporation.

History
KQST signed on the air on May 1, 1984, airing an Easy Listening format including special programs from Jazz and Big Band formats. In 1992, the format was changed to a Hot AC format, but the special programs that were formerly used from its easy listening format still runs during its early Hot AC days for a shorter period of time. The station went a full Top 40 format a shorter time later on.

Yavapai Broadcasting
In August 2004, W. Grant Hafley, owner of Yavapai Broadcasting, reached an agreement to acquire KQST for a reported $3 million.

Station Ownership
 1984–1988 ARIZONA MEDIACOMM
also owned sister KAZM-AM
 1988–2004 ROCKET RADIO CORPORATION
also owned sister stations KAZM-AM and KLOD-FM (now KVNA-FM)
 2004–Current YAVAPAI BROADCASTING
currently owns KVNA-AM, KVNA-FM, KVRD-FM, KKLD-FM, KYBC-AM

References

External links

 

QST
Contemporary hit radio stations in the United States
Radio stations established in 1999
1999 establishments in Arizona